This is a list of the main association football rivalries in Russia.

 Moscow Derbies:
Oldest Russian derby: Spartak Moscow vs. Dynamo Moscow
 Main Moscow derby: Spartak Moscow vs. CSKA Moscow
Any match between Torpedo Moscow, Spartak Moscow, CSKA Moscow, Lokomotiv Moscow and Dynamo Moscow
 Derby of the Southern Administrative district of Moscow: FC Chertanovo Moscow vs. FC Torpedo Moscow
Rivalry of Two Capitals:
Spartak Moscow vs. Zenit Saint Petersburg
Dynamo Moscow vs. Zenit Saint Petersburg
CSKA Moscow vs. Zenit Saint Petersburg
Saint Petersburg derby:
Traditional: Dynamo Saint Petersburg vs. Zenit Saint Petersburg
New: FC Tosno / FC Leningradets vs. Zenit Saint Petersburg
 Baltic derby: Zenit Saint Petersburg vs. Baltika Kaliningrad
 Volga Derby: 
Rubin Kazan vs. Krylia Sovetov Samara
Volga Ulyanovsk vs. Volga Nizhny Novgorod
 Any match between Rotor Volgograd, Sokol Saratov
 Siberian derby: Tom Tomsk vs. Sibir Novosibirsk vs. Tyumen
 Any match between Novokuznetsk, Irtysh, Yenisey, Baikal
 Krasnodar derby: Kuban Krasnodar vs. FC Krasnodar
 Golden Ring derby: Shinnik Yaroslavl vs. Tekstilshchik Ivanovo vs. Torpedo Vladimir, can also included Spartak Kostroma, Dynamo Kostroma
 Far Eastern derby: Luch-Energiya Vladivostok vs. SKA-Khabarovsk
 Ural derby: Ural vs. Amkar vs. Orenburg
 Rostov-on-Don derby: Rostov vs. SKA
 Kostroma derby: Spartak Kostroma vs. Dynamo Kostroma
 Caucasian derby: Akhmat vs. Anzhi, can also included Spartak Nalchik, Alania Vladikavkaz
 Nizhny Novgorod derbies:
 Main Nizhny Novgorod derby: Volga vs. Lokomotiv-NN
 Little Nizhny Novgorod derbies: Volga vs. Nizhny Novgorod, Nizhnyy Novgorod vs. Lokomotiv-NN
 Any match between Volga / Elektronika, Torpedo NN, Nizhny Novgorod, Lokomotiv-NN and Olimpiyets
 Astrakhan derby: Volgar vs. Astrakhan
 Makhachkala derby: Anzhi vs. Dynamo Makhachkala vs. Legion-Dinamo vs. Makhachkala
 Volgograd derby: Rotor vs. Olimpiya vs. Volgograd
 Vladikavkaz derby: Alaniya vs. Avtodor vs. Spartak Vladikavkaz
 Tatarstan derby:
 Any match between KAMAZ, Neftekhimik, Rubin Kazan / FC Rubin-2 Kazan and FC Alnas Almetyevsk
 FC Neftyanik Bugulma vs. FC Progress Zelenodolsk
 Moscow Oblast derbies:
 Any match between FC Saturn Ramenskoye, FC Khimki and FC Vityaz Podolsk
 Podolsk derbies:
 FC Avangard Podolsk (defunct) vs. FC Vityaz Podolsk
 FC Podolye Podolsky district / FC Peresvet Podolsk (until 2018) vs. FC Vityaz Podolsk
 Derby of the north-western part of Moscow region: FC Zorky Krasnogorsk vs. FC Khimki
 Chernozem and Central Russian inter-regional rivalries:
 Any match between Avangard Kursk, Dynamo Bryansk, Oryol, Salyut, Metallurg Lipetsk, FC Fakel Voronezh, Avangard Kursk, FC Tambov (earlier FC Spartak Tambov), Metallurg-Oskol.
 Lipetsk–Moscow regions derby: FC Metallurg Lipetsk vs. FC Vityaz Podolsk
 Tula–Oryol derby: FC Arsenal Tula vs. FC Oryol
 Kaluga Oblast derby: FC Kaluga vs. FC Kvant Obninsk, earlier Lokomotiv Kaluga vs FC Obninsk
 Lipetsk Oblast derby: FC Metallurg Lipetsk vs. FC Yelets
 Voronezh Oblast derby: Fakel Voronezh vs. Lokomotiv Liski
 Pskov Oblast derby: FC Pskov-747 / FC Pskov-2000 (FC Pskov, FC Mashinostroitel Pskov) vs. FC Luki-Energiya Velikiye Luki

References

Football in Russia